Aeria eurimedia is a species of butterfly of the family Nymphalidae. It is found in Central and northern South America.

The larvae have been recorded feeding on Prestonia portabellensis.

Subspecies
Aeria eurimedia eurimedia (Guianas, Surinam)
Aeria eurimedia negricola (C. & R. Felder, 1862) (Peru)
Aeria eurimedia agna Godman & Salvin, [1879] (Nicaragua to Panama and Venezuela)
Aeria eurimedia pacifica Godman & Salvin, [1879] (Mexico, Guatemala)
Aeria eurimedia sisenna Weymer, 1899 (Ecuador)
Aeria eurimedia latistriga Hering, 1925 (Colombia)

References

Butterflies described in 1777
Ithomiini
Nymphalidae of South America